Justin Goltz (born August 23, 1987) is a gridiron football quarterback who is retired. He played college football at Occidental College.

Goltz has also been a member of the Detroit Lions, Sacramento Mountain Lions, and Winnipeg Blue Bombers.

Early years
Goltz attended Walled Lake Central High School in Walled Lake, Michigan. Goltz was a 3-sport athlete (football, baseball, basketball) at Division III Occidental College.

Professional career
He attended NFL Rookie Mini-Camp with the Detroit Lions in 2009, but was not signed to a contract. Goltz was drafted 3rd overall in the 2010 UFL draft by Dennis Green and the Sacramento Mountain Lions. He signed with the Winnipeg Blue Bombers in October 2010. On July 26, 2013, he played his first game as starting quarterback, following an injury to Buck Pierce.

In 2013, Goltz was criticized for his touchdown celebrations in a game against Saskatchewan Roughriders. He later gave a public statement that he will not celebrate touchdowns.

Personal
His wife, Meri-De, is former professional beach and indoor volleyball player.

References

External links
Edmonton Esimos bio 
Winnipeg Blue Bombers bio

1987 births
Living people
American football quarterbacks
American players of Canadian football
Canadian football quarterbacks
Edmonton Elks players
Occidental Tigers baseball players
Occidental Tigers football players
Occidental Tigers men's basketball players
People from Walled Lake, Michigan
Players of American football from Michigan
Winnipeg Blue Bombers players
American men's basketball players